The 1968/69 NTFL season was the 48th season of the Northern Territory Football League (NTFL).

Darwin have won there 16th premiership title while defeating St Marys in the grand final by 42 points.

Grand Final

References

Northern Territory Football League seasons
NTFL